Some reports suggest the existence of Romani people in Morocco.  Thomas (2000) states that "Xoraxane or Muslim Gypsies have been reported in Morocco. It is suspected that Kalo (or Calo) Gypsies from Spain have migrated to Morocco for business reasons. However no government statistics can substantiate this supposition. Similarly, it may be true that French speaking Gypsies or Manouche may have in the past or still today traveled and worked in Morocco but there is no evidence of this at the moment."
Phillips (2001) mentions rather speculatively that "Some Kali or Gitan are probably in Morocco."  The available reports are not sufficiently precise to confirm the Romani identity or even existence of such groups, but if they exist and are of Romani origin, then they would have immigrated to the territory of the present day Morocco ultimately from South Asia, and proximately from Spain and/or Algeria.

See also
Romani people in Egypt
Romani people in Libya
Romani people in Syria
Romani people in Iraq
Nawar people
Robert Grant Haliburton

References

External links
Dom of North Africa: An Overview, C.F. Thomas, Kuri 1:1, January 2000 (Dom Research Center)

Ethnic groups in Morocco
Dom in Africa
Dom people